The United States Air Force's 19th Intelligence Squadron (19th IS) is an intelligence unit located at Pope Air Force Base, North Carolina. The 19th IS is associated with United States Army airborne and ground operations.

Mission
The mission of the 19th Intelligence Squadron is to provide knowledge and communications expertise to develop realistic training scenarios for special operations forces' tactics, techniques and procedures validation.

Previous designations
19th Intelligence Squadron (14 May 2007 – present)

Assignments

Major command/field operating agency
 Air Combat Command (29 Sep 2014–Present)
 Air Force Intelligence, Surveillance and Reconnaissance Agency (14 May 2007 - 29 Sep 2014)

Wings/groups
361st Intelligence, Surveillance and Reconnaissance Group (29 October 2008 – present)

Bases stationed
Pope Army Air Field, North Carolina (???-present)

References

External links
Air Force Intelligence, Surveillance and Reconnaissance Agency 

019
0019